From the Ground Up: Edge's Picks from U2360° is a live album released by the Irish rock band U2 in December 2012 only available to u2.com subscribers. The 15 tracks, recorded from the U2 360° Tour, were selected by guitarist The Edge.

Track listing

Personnel

U2
 Bono – lead vocals, guitar
 The Edge – guitar, backing vocals, piano
 Adam Clayton – bass guitar
 Larry Mullen, Jr. – drums, percussion

Additional
 Terry Lawless – keyboards on track 5, bonus track 4. Hammond organ on track 12.

Technical
 Production – Declan Gaffney
 Mixing – Declan Gaffney
 Mastering – Pete Maher

References

U2 live albums
2012 live albums